Morris S. Levy is a film, television, and theatrical producer who was born in Brooklyn, NY and raised in Kings Point, New York.  He is the founder and President of M.E.G.A. Films (Morsly Entertainment Group and the Arts), a New York-based production company.  He often films in Great Neck as well as all over the New York City area.  His films have appeared in the Sundance Film Festival (The Ten-starring Paul Rudd, Winona Ryder, Jessica Alba and Liev Schreiber), the Cannes Film Festival (Seduced and Abandoned-starring Alec Baldwin, Ryan Gosling and Jessica Chastain), and the Tribeca Film Festival  (Descent-starring Rosario Dawson) amongst other festivals.  His film A Novel Romance won the Audience Award and Best Picture Award at the New York International Film Festival. His TV series, Cop Show (starring Colin Quinn, Jerry Seinfeld, Amy Schumer, Chris Rock and Seth Meyers) won best comedy, among other awards at the 2015 New York City Webfest. His 2020 critically acclaimed film ″Angie: Lost Girls″ won Best Picture at the Moving Parts Film Festival and also won an Award of Excellence from the Accolade Global Film Competition. Mr. Levy is a producer of the Off-Broadway show My Life on a Diet starring Renee Taylor (Emmy Winner and Academy Award Nominee), which received rave reviews from the NY Times, NY Post, LA Times, and was nominated for a 2019 Lucille Lortel Award for Outstanding Solo Show. He is also a producer on the Off Broadway show Mornings at Seven (revival of the Tony Award winning play) starring Tony Roberts, Judith Ivey, and Don Lauria. Before entering the entertainment business, he was a principal in a ladies' clothing company and was also prominent in the New York nightlife business as a promoter/owner.

Partial filmography 
 Angie: Lost Girls (2020)
 Cop Show (2015-2016)
 Seduced and Abandoned (2013)
 Affluenza (2014)
 The Ten (2007))
 Descent (2007 film)

References

External links 
 
 Morris S. Levy- NY Times
 AFM Can TV Save the Indie Film Business
 Colin Quinn's new series cop show premieres
 Renee-Taylor-to-Appear-in-MY-LIFE-ON-A-DIET-Off-Broadway-This-Summer-20180531
NY Times Review My Life on a Diet
Renée Taylor's My Life On a Diet Wins United Solo Special Award
 Star-of-Persia-Novel-Being-Adapted-for-TV-by-Samuel-Franco-Evan-Kilgore-M-E-G-A-Films
 Judith Ivey, Tony Roberts, John Rubinstein, More Star in Off-Broadway Revival of Morning's at Seven Beginning October 20
Patricia Velasquez, Rumer Willis & More Set For Social Impact Film ‘Maya’ From Director Julia Verdin

Year of birth missing (living people)
Living people
People from Brooklyn
Film producers from New York (state)
People from Kings Point, New York